Dou Jingtong (born 3 January 1997), also known as Leah Dou, is a Chinese singer-songwriter who primarily sings in English. She is the daughter of Chinese musician Dou Wei and Chinese-born Hong Kong singer Faye Wong. She first contributed her voice to her mother's song "童 (Tong)" when she was 1 year old. In 2011, Dou formed her first band and became the lead singer. In 2012, she released her first song "With You". In 2013, she launched second personal original single "On the Beach", in the same year, she released third personal original single "Blue Flamingo".  She debuted in 2015 in a performance in Tokyo. Later in Clockenflap 2015, she debuted in Hong Kong. She released her first single River Run on December 11, 2015, selling 25,000 copies on QQ Music in three days. Her second single Brother was released in 2016 for a Chinese Shu Uemura campaign. In 2016, she won the QQ New Female Artist Of The Year.

Dou has two half sisters, Li Yan, the daughter of her mother Faye Wong and her stepfather Li Yapeng, and Dou Jiayuan, the daughter of her father Dou Wei and her stepmother Gao Yuan. Dou and her half sister Li Yan and her mother Faye Wong were all born at Peking Union Medical College Hospital in Dongcheng District, Beijing.

Before reaching her current level of fame, Dou spent time studying at Berklee College of Music, only to withdraw from school after two years to couch-surf in Los Angeles.

Discography

Albums

EPs

Singles

Other original songs
"With You"
"On the Beach"

Awards and nominations

See also
Sing and Play — the final track "Tong" features Leah's voice when she was 1
Lovers & Strangers — the title track "Zhi Ai Mosheng Ren" features Leah's voice when she was 2

References

Sources

External links
Leah Dou on Facebook
Leah Dou on Twitter
Leah Dou on YouTube
Leah Dou on Instagram
Leah Dou on SoundCloud
Leah Dou on Sina Weibo
Leah Dou on Ameba

1997 births
Living people
Singers from Beijing
Chinese women singer-songwriters
English-language singers from China
Japanese-language singers of China
21st-century Chinese women singers
Faye Wong